Kirsteen Fiona McEwan-Miller (born 20 November 1975) is a retired Scottish badminton player. She reached a career high as world number 8 and has a number of titles to her name. McEwan competed at the 1998 and 2002 Commonwealth Games, and won a mixed team bronze in 2002.

Personal life 
Her mother, Fiona McEwan, was a former Badminton Scotland president, and Commonwealth Games Scotland vice-chair. His brother-in-law, Craig Robertson, also a former Scottish national badminton player.

Achievements

IBF World Grand Prix 
The World Badminton Grand Prix sanctioned by International Badminton Federation (IBF) from 1983 to 2006.

Women's doubles

IBF International 
Women's doubles

Mixed doubles

References

External links 

1975 births
Living people
Scottish female badminton players
Badminton players at the 1998 Commonwealth Games
Badminton players at the 2002 Commonwealth Games
Commonwealth Games bronze medallists for Scotland
Commonwealth Games medallists in badminton
Medallists at the 2002 Commonwealth Games